Mauicetus is a genus of extinct baleen whale from the Late Oligocene of New Zealand.

Taxonomy
Mauicetus was originally named Lophocephalus by William Benham, but that name was already used for a beetle, and Benham provided the replacement name Mauicetus. Three more species were named in 1956: M. brevicollis, M. lophocephalus, and M. waitakiensis. Nowadays, Mauicetus parki is considered a stem-balaenopteroid, while M. lophocephalus and M. waitakiensis have been reclassified in Eomysticetidae, with M. lophocephalus and M. waitakiensis being assigned to Tokarahia and Tohoraata.

References

Oligocene cetaceans
Extinct animals of New Zealand
Prehistoric cetacean genera